Alfred Molina (born Alfredo Molina; 24 May 1953) is an English actor known for his work on the stage and screen. He first rose to prominence in the West End, earning a nomination for the Laurence Olivier Award for Best Newcomer in a Play for his performance in the production of Oklahoma! in 1980. He made his film debut as Satipo in Raiders of the Lost Ark and his Broadway debut as Yvan in a production of Art from 1998 to 1999. His other Broadway roles include Tevye in the musical Fiddler on the Roof from 2004 to 2005 and Mark Rothko in the play Red from 2009 to 2010.

On screen, his best known roles include Kenneth Halliwell in Prick Up Your Ears (1987), Sayyed Bozorg Mahmoody in Not Without My Daughter, (1991), Mellersh Wilkins in Enchanted April (1992), Rahad Jackson in Boogie Nights (1997), Comte de Reynaud in Chocolat (2000), Diego Rivera in Frida (2002), Johann Tetzel in Luther (2003), Bishop Aringarosa in The Da Vinci Code (2006), Jack Mellor in An Education (2009), and George in Love Is Strange (2014). He has voiced characters in Rango (2011), Monsters University (2013), Dragons: Race to the Edge (2016), Ralph Breaks the Internet (2018), Frozen II (2019), and DC League of Super-Pets (2022). He is also known for his portrayal of Otto Octavius / Doctor Octopus in Sam Raimi's Spider-Man 2 (2004) and the Marvel Cinematic Universe film Spider-Man: No Way Home (2021).

Molina's work has brought him widespread acclaim. For his portrayal of Robert Aldrich in the miniseries Feud (2017), he was nominated for a Golden Globe Award and a Primetime Emmy Award. He received a BAFTA Award nomination for Best Supporting Actor for his performance in Frida, and has also been nominated for an Independent Spirit Award, a British Independent Film Award, five Screen Actors Guild Awards, and three Tony Awards.

Early life
He was born Alfredo Molina on 24 May 1953 in the Paddington district of London. His father, Esteban J. Molina, was a Spanish immigrant from Murcia, who came to England in 1939, and worked as a waiter and chauffeur. His mother, Giovanna (née Bonelli), was an Italian immigrant who moved to Britain after World War II, and who cleaned rooms in a hotel, and worked as a cook and housekeeper. Molina grew up in a working-class district in Notting Hill that was inhabited by many other immigrant families. He attended a Roman Catholic secondary school there. He decided to become an actor after seeing Spartacus at the age of nine, and attended the Guildhall School of Music and Drama, as well as auditioning for and becoming a member of the National Youth Theatre. At the age of 21, he changed his name to Alfred, at the urging of his first agent.

Career

Early work
Molina appeared with Leonard Rossiter in the sitcom The Losers (1978). He made his film debut with a minor role alongside Harrison Ford in Steven Spielberg's adventure film Raiders of the Lost Ark (1981) as Indiana Jones' ill-fated guide, Satipo, during its iconic opening sequence. Molina stated in an interview in 2013 that he owes his stage and film career to the Indiana Jones series. "I'm very, very proud of that, I have to admit I didn't think at the time, 'Oh, this is going to go down in movie history.' I'd never been in front of a camera before," Molina said about his short but memorable appearance in Raiders of the Lost Ark. He recalled getting the job as a "gift from God" and said, "I've publicly thanked Steven many, many times. That job saved my bacon, in more ways than one." About his now-famous line in the film, Molina stated that "I've never had a problem with people coming up to me about it. They'll shout that line to me, 'Throw me the idol, I'll throw you the whip!'  I'm delighted that people still remember it."
 
However, his big break came with Letter to Brezhnev (1985), which he followed with a starring role in Prick Up Your Ears (1987), playing Joe Orton's lover (and eventual murderer) Kenneth Halliwell. He was originally cast as Arnold Rimmer in the TV sitcom Red Dwarf, but was replaced by Chris Barrie.

1990s
In the early 1990s, Molina was a ubiquitous presence on British television, with his highest profile role being the lead in the first two series of El C.I.D.. He appeared in the critically acclaimed films such as Mike Newell's costume drama Enchanted April (1992), Richard Donner's western comedy Maverick (1994), and Jim Jarmusch's western Dead Man (1995). Subsequent film roles include the drama Not Without My Daughter (1991), the science fiction horror film Species (1995), the broad comedy Dudley Do-Right (1999). With a midwestern American accent, Molina starred alongside Betty White in the US television series Ladies Man, which ran from 1999 to 2001. In 1993 he appeared in the BBC miniseries adaptation of A Year in Provence, playing the annoying Tony, along with John Thaw and Lindsay Duncan. In 1995, Molina starred with Marisa Tomei in The Perez Family, playing Cuban refugees who pretend to be married so they can more easily stay in America. Marjorie Baumgarten praised Molina as attaining "the right mixture of gentle honor and baffled stupefaction" to portray his character, although Peter Rainer of Los Angeles Times called Molina "so intensely sodden that he’s like a great big scowling dark cloud." Molina has worked twice with Paul Thomas Anderson, first in Boogie Nights (1997) and then in Magnolia (1999).

2000s
In 2000, Molina appeared in Lasse Hallström's Chocolat which received critical acclaim and an Academy Award for Best Picture nomination. He gained wide recognition for his portrayal of Diego Rivera alongside Salma Hayek in the biopic Frida (2002), a role for which he gained BAFTA and SAG award nominations. He played himself alongside Steve Coogan in Jarmusch's Coffee and Cigarettes (2003) and gained further commercial recognition when he portrayed Johann Tetzel in Luther (2003) and Otto Octavius / Doctor Octopus in Spider-Man 2 (2004), which became one of the highest-grossing films of that year. For the latter, Molina was nominated for a Satellite Award as Best Supporting Actor. He reprised his role in the video game adaptation. In 2006, Molina portrayed Touchstone in Kenneth Branagh's film version of Shakespeare's As You Like It and appeared in Ron Howard's adaptation of The Da Vinci Code. Molina provided the voice of the villain Ares in the 2009 animated film Wonder Woman.

Molina's stage work has included two major Royal National Theatre productions, Tennessee Williams' The Night of the Iguana (as Shannon) and David Mamet's Speed-the-Plow (as Fox). In his Broadway debut, Molina performed in Yasmina Reza's Tony Award-winning play 'Art', for which he received a Tony nomination in 1998. In 2004, Molina returned to the stage, starring as Tevye in the Broadway production of Fiddler on the Roof. For his performance he once again received a Tony Award nomination, this time for Best Actor in a Musical. He received his third Tony Award nomination for Red in 2010, for Best Performance by a Leading Actor in a Play.

In 2007, Molina narrated a 17-part original audiobook for Audible.com called The Chopin Manuscript. This serialised novel was written by a team of 15 best-selling thriller writers, including Jeffery Deaver, Lee Child, Joseph Finder and Lisa Scottoline. The novel won the 2008 Audiobook of the Year Award form Audio Publishers Association.

2010s
On 1 April 2010, Molina opened at Broadway's John Golden Theatre in the role of artist Mark Rothko in John Logan's drama Red opposite Eddie Redmayne for a limited engagement through 27 June. He had played the role to much critical success at the Donmar Warehouse in London in December 2009 and revisited that role at the Wyndham's Theatre in the West End in 2018.

In 2010, Molina starred opposite Dawn French in the six-part BBC sitcom Roger & Val Have Just Got In, with a second series in 2012.

Molina has three Lego Minifigures modelled after him, namely Doctor Octopus from Spider-Man 2, Satipo from Raiders of the Lost Ark and Sheik Amar from Prince of Persia.

In July 2010, it was announced that Molina had joined the cast of Law & Order: LA as Deputy District Attorney Morales. He previously guest-starred in a two-part crossover in 2005 in two other Law & Order franchise shows, Law & Order: Special Victims Unit and Law & Order: Trial by Jury.

Molina is a patron of the performing arts group Theatretrain. He is also a longtime member of the Los Angeles theatre company The New American Theatre, formerly known as Circus Theatricals, where he often teaches Shakespeare and Scene Study along with the company's artistic director Jack Stehlin.

In 2017 he portrayed film director Robert Aldrich in Ryan Murphy's FX limited series Feud: Bette & Joan. The series revolved around the filming of What Ever Happened to Baby Jane? in 1962 and the relationship between actresses Bette Davis and Joan Crawford played by Susan Sarandon and Jessica Lange respectively. Molina received critical praise for the film as well as awards attention received nominations from the Primetime Emmy Awards, and Golden Globe Awards for his performance.

2020s
In 2020, Molina appeared in David Oyelowo's drama The Water Man, and Emerald Fennell's black comedy thriller Promising Young Woman. On 8 December 2020, it was announced that he would be returning as Doctor Octopus for Spider-Man: No Way Home in the Marvel Cinematic Universe, set to premiere on 17 December 2021. Molina later confirmed that he would actually be reprising his role as the Spider-Man 2 incarnation of Doctor Octopus in No Way Home, retconning his character's apparent death at the end of the former film. He was digitally de-aged to his 2004 self.

On 2 September 2021, it was announced that Alfred Molina was set to star in Amazon Prime police drama series Three Pines, which comes from The Crown producer Left Bank Pictures. Molina plays Chief Inspector Armand Gamache of the Sûreté du Québec, the lead character from Louise Penny’s book series, he also serves as executive producer for the show. The trailer came out in October 2022 and the show premiered in December 2022.

Personal life
In 1986, Molina married actress Jill Gascoine in Tower Hamlets, London. They remained so until her death on 28 April 2020 in Los Angeles from Alzheimer's disease.

Molina resides in Los Angeles, California. In 2004, he announced that he had become a U.S. citizen. He is fluent in English, Spanish, and Italian. In 2017, he moved to La Cañada Flintridge.

In addition to acting, Molina is an advocate for people with Acquired Immune Deficiency Syndrome (AIDS). He donates towards AIDS research, participates in the Los Angeles AIDS Walk and appeared as himself in a documentary produced by Joseph Kibler (who has been HIV+ and paraplegic since his birth, c. 1989) about Kibler's life titled Walk On, first screened in 2013.

In November 2019, director Jennifer Lee confirmed that she is in a relationship with Molina. They were married in August 2021.

When playing the role of Sayyed Bozorg Mahmoody in Not Without My Daughter, Molina was once assaulted on his way to a rehearsal by a man who mistook him for the real Mahmoody.

Filmography

Film

Television

Theatre

Radio and audiobooks

Video games

Awards and nominations

References

External links
 
 
 
 
 Alfred Molina interviewed on Downstage Center XM Radio at American Theatre Wing, November 2004
 Q&A: Alfred Molina

1953 births
Living people
Alumni of the Guildhall School of Music and Drama
Audiobook narrators
British expatriate male actors in the United States
Drama Desk Award winners
English expatriates in the United States
English male film actors
English male musical theatre actors
English male Shakespearean actors
English male stage actors
English male television actors
English male video game actors
English male voice actors
English people of Italian descent
English people of Spanish descent
HIV/AIDS activists
Male actors from London
National Youth Theatre members
People from Notting Hill
People from Paddington
People with acquired American citizenship
Royal Shakespeare Company members
Theatre World Award winners
20th-century English male actors
21st-century English male actors